The Bum Bandit is an animated short film created by the Fleischer Studios in 1931 as part of the Talkartoons series. Betty Boop is voiced by Harriet Lee.

Plot
Bimbo prepares to rob a train that he has forced to stop. He then sings "The Holdup Rag." A ferocious bearded cowboy emerges, eats the barrel of Bimbo's gun, and, pulling off his beard and costume, reveals himself to in fact be his wife Dangerous Nan McGrew, whom he had abandoned. She drags Bimbo through a pond, and then throws him into the locomotive, and disconnects it from the rest of the train. They then drive off, cover the engineer's cabin and send all their wet clothing out on a line to dry, including Betty's panties and socks.

See also
Dangerous Nan McGrew (1930) feature film

References

External links
 
The Bum Bandit at bcdb

1931 films
1930s English-language films
1930s animated short films
American black-and-white films
Fleischer Studios short films
1930s American animated films
Paramount Pictures short films
Short films directed by Dave Fleischer